Phuti Peter Keetse is a South African politician who served as a Member of the National Assembly for the Economic Freedom Fighters (EFF) from 2019 to 2020. He was the president of the party's student organisation and a FeesMustFall activist.

Background
Keetse was born in Sekhung village in Limpopo. He has a BTech in Civil Engineering from the University of Johannesburg. He was active in #FeesMustFall protests that occurred at the university.

Keetse joined the Economic Freedom Fighters, when it was founded back in July 2013. In 2017, he was elected president of its student command.

Parliamentary career
Keetse was elected to the National Assembly of South Africa in May 2019. In June 2019, he became a member of the Portfolio Committee on Higher Education, Science and Technology. He was a member of the portfolio committee until 4 September 2020.

Keetse resigned from Parliament on 5 October 2020.

References

External links
Mr Phuti Peter Keetse – Parliament of South Africa

Living people
People from Limpopo
Economic Freedom Fighters politicians
University of Johannesburg alumni
Members of the National Assembly of South Africa
21st-century South African politicians
Year of birth missing (living people)